Neoscortechinia is a plant genus of the family Euphorbiaceae first described as a genus in 1897.  It is native to Southeast Asia and Papuasia.

Species
 Neoscortechinia angustifolia (Airy Shaw) Welzen - Sabah, Kalimantan
 Neoscortechinia forbesii (Hook.f.) S.Moore - New Guinea, Admiralty Islands, Bismarck Archipelago, Solomon Islands
 Neoscortechinia kingii  (Hook.f.) Pax & K.Hoffm. - W Malaysia, Sumatra, Borneo 
 Neoscortechinia nicobarica (Hook.f.) Pax & K.Hoffm. - Nicobar Islands, Myanmar, Malaysia, Indonesia, Philippines, W New Guinea
 Neoscortechinia philippinensis (Merr.) Welzen - Myanmar, Thailand, Malaysia, W Indonesia, Philippines
 Neoscortechinia sumatrensis S.Moore - W Malaysia, N. Sumatra, Simeuluë, Borneo

References 

Euphorbiaceae genera
Acalyphoideae